This is a list of singles that charted in the top ten of the Billboard Hot 100 during 2000.

Destiny's Child, 'N Sync, and Christina Aguilera each had three top-ten hits in 2000, tying them for the most top-ten hits during the year.

Top-ten singles

1999 peaks

2001 peaks

See also
2000 in music
List of Hot 100 number-one singles of 2000 (U.S.)
Billboard Year-End Hot 100 singles of 2000

References

General sources

Joel Whitburn Presents the Billboard Hot 100 Charts: The Nineties
Joel Whitburn Presents the Billboard Hot 100 Charts: The 2000s
Additional information obtained can be verified within Billboard's online archive services and print editions of the magazine.

2000
United States Hot 100 Top 10